FedCon (short for Federation Convention) is a science fiction convention, also including a bit of fantasy, in Germany. It focuses on Star Trek. FedCon is the biggest Star Trek convention in Europe.

History 
It has been held each spring since 1992. In 2005, it was held in Bonn—as several years before—but in 2006, it took place in Fulda, while it returned to Bonn in 2007. FedCon is attended by sci-fi fans from 25-30 different countries around the world and is frequently hosted by Master of Ceremonies, Marc B. Lee of Orlando, Florida. FedCon used to be a 3-day convention, but due to its 20th anniversary, it moved to Düsseldorf Maritim hotel and became a 4-day convention. In 2010, it was hosted by Ed Wasser, 2011 until 2013 by Garrett Wang, and since 2014, Nessi Wann-Petry is hosting the show.

Created by Dirk Bartholomae of Augsburg, Germany, FedCon has shown its fans a different brand of conventioneering by providing stage entertainment with professional stunt teams, musical acts and performances by its actor guests.

FedCon GmbH, its corporate label, is also responsible for the Ring*Con Lord of the Rings convention.

Contrary to many science fiction events originating in the 1960s and 1980s, which were orientated on sci-fi literature, FedCon focuses on movies and television. It started as a pure Star Trek convention and spread its spectrum over the years.

Guests 
Starting with Walter Koenig, first guests were actors from the various Star Trek series, but later also included actors and co-workers from other series like Babylon 5, Battlestar Galactica, Star Wars, Buffy, Farscape, Andromeda, Stargate and Xena: Warrior Princess. Other special guests attending the FedCon include authors, voice artists, scientists and astronauts.

FedCon USA 
FedCon is not to be confused with FedCon USA, a similar convention in Dallas, United States, in June 2008 which licensed the name but closed mid-convention due to poor attendance.  FedCon claims that it disassociated itself with FedCon USA in January 2008.

Activities
Activities and events at the convention typically include (but are not limited to):

 Panel discussions with actors and other guests.
 Autographing sessions
 Photographing sessions with the actors
 Speeches or other presentations by scientists and experts about a specific topic, like the Klingon language.
 Socialising in the evening convention-party, where some stars might also appear.
 Costuming - both formal competition, and casual hall costumes.
 Dealers' room - a large hall full of people selling books, movies, jewellery, costumes (often including weapons), games, comic books, etc.
 Art show - presenting paintings, drawings, sculpture and other work, primarily on science fiction and fantasy themes
 Live performances, e.g. Klingon Rock Music or a fight show.
 Watching science fiction movies, television shows, etc.
 Possibility for local fangroups and role-playing groups to represent themselves

Special Facts
In the year 2011, FedCon achieved the world record of the most people in a Star Trek costume, having counted 691 people. They had achieved the record in the previous year with 507 persons, but it was soon beaten by a convention in Las Vegas with 571 costumed people. In September 2011, this record has been beaten again at a convention in Las Vegas with 1,040 fans.

Previous FedCons

References

External links 

FedCon website
FedCon History
FedCon Photos
Fedcon Videos

Science fiction conventions in Europe
Star Trek fandom
Fantasy conventions